The posterior meningeal artery is the largest vessel supplying the dura region of the posterior fossa. It typically arises from the ascending pharyngeal artery although other origins have been seen, such as the occipital artery. The artery or its branches enter the cranium through jugular foramen, foramen magnum or hypoglossal canal.

See also
 Meninges

References

 Diagnostic Cerebral Angiography, 2nd edition, Anne G. Osborn

Arteries of the head and neck